The 1979–80 Yorkshire Cup was the seventy-second occasion on which the  Yorkshire Cup competition had been held.

Leeds winning the trophy by beating Halifax by the score of 15-6

The match was played at Headingley, Leeds, now in West Yorkshire. The attendance was 9,137 and receipts were £9,999

This was Leeds' seventh victory (and the first of two consecutive victories for the  third time within the  sequence) in what would be eight times in the space of thirteen seasons.

This would be Halifax's last appearance in a Yorkshire Cup final, giving them a total record of five wins and four defeats.

Background 

This season there were no junior/amateur clubs taking part, no new entrants and no "leavers" and so the total of entries remained the  same at sixteen.

This in turn resulted in no byes in the first round.

Competition and results

Round 1 
Involved  8 matches (with no byes) and 16 clubs

Round 2 - Quarter-finals 
Involved 4 matches and 8 clubs

Round 3 – Semi-finals  
Involved 2 matches and 4 clubs

Final

Teams and scorers 

Scoring - Try = three points - Goal = two points - Drop goal = one point

The road to success

Notes and comments 
1 * This was the first Yorkshire Cup match played by the renamed  Hunslet at their "new" temporary home at Batley's Mount Pleasant after the owners of Elland Road Greyhound Stadium suddenly closed the  previous ground

2 * The attendance is given as 9,134 by RUGBYLEAGUEproject  but the  Rothmans Rugby League Yearbook of 1991-92 and 1990-91 gives the  attendance as three more at 9,137

3 * Headingley, Leeds, is the home ground of Leeds RLFC with a capacity of 21,000. The record attendance was  40,175 for a league match between Leeds and Bradford Northern on 21 May 1947.

General information for those unfamiliar 
The Rugby League Yorkshire Cup competition was a knock-out competition between (mainly professional) rugby league clubs from  the  county of Yorkshire. The actual area was at times increased to encompass other teams from  outside the  county such as Newcastle, Mansfield, Coventry, and even London (in the form of Acton & Willesden).

The Rugby League season always (until the onset of "Summer Rugby" in 1996) ran from around August-time through to around May-time and this competition always took place early in the season, in the Autumn, with the final taking place in (or just before) December (The only exception to this was when disruption of the fixture list was caused during, and immediately after, the two World Wars)

See also 
1979–80 Northern Rugby Football League season
Rugby league county cups

References

External links
Saints Heritage Society
1896–97 Northern Rugby Football Union season at wigan.rlfans.com 
Hull&Proud Fixtures & Results 1896/1897
Widnes Vikings - One team, one passion Season In Review - 1896-97
The Northern Union at warringtonwolves.org

RFL Yorkshire Cup
Yorkshire Cup